Cascade School District No. 228 is a Class-A public school district in Chelan County, Washington. The district includes the towns of Dryden, Lake Wenatchee, Leavenworth, Peshastin, Plain and Winton. Four of the district schools are located in Leavenworth, while the fifth, Peshastin Dryden Elementary, is in the unincorporated community of Peshastin. The district office is located in Leavenworth, and the district school board currently has five members.

As of 2005 the school district had an enrollment of 1454, with 76 full-time teachers for a ratio of 15 to 1. The largest school is Cascade High School with an enrollment of 534.

Demographics
In the 2009 school year, the district had 51 students classified as homeless by the Department of Education, or 2.2% of students in the district.

Schools
 Cascade High School — grades 9–12
 Icicle River Middle School — grades 6–8; PK
 Alpine Lakes Elementary School — grades 3–5
 Peshastin Dryden Elementary School — grades K–2
 Beaver Valley School — grades K–4

References

External links
 Cascade School District
 School District Ratings

School districts in Washington (state)
Education in Chelan County, Washington